Pachanqutu or Phanchaqutu (Quechua pacha world, universe; time, -n a suffix, phancha open (like a blossomed flower), qutu heap, pile, Hispanicized spelling Pachancoto, Panchacoto) is a mountain in the Paryaqaqa or Waruchiri mountain range in the Andes of Peru, about  high. It is situated in the Lima Region, Huarochirí Province, San Mateo District, and in the Junín Region, Yauli Province, Suitucancha District. It lieson the western border of the Nor Yauyos-Cochas Landscape Reserve. Pachanqutu lies near Tunshu, southeast of Paka (Paca), south of Sullcon and Americo, and west of the branch of Antachaire.

References

Mountains of Peru
Mountains of Lima Region
Mountains of Junín Region